Tommy Butterfield (born 1988) is a Papua New Guinean professional rugby league footballer who played for the PNG Hunters and Brisbane Tigers as a  in the Queensland Cup .He is a Papua New Guinea international and was previously contracted to the Brisbane Broncos in the National Rugby League.

Early years
Butterfield attended Redcliffe State High School and the University of the Sunshine Coast.

Playing career
Butterfield was a Redcliffe Dolphins junior and played for the Easts Tigers in the Queensland Cup.

In 2012 he was approached by Whitehaven but the club failed to get Rugby Football League approval.

Representative career
Butterfield toured Europe with Papua New Guinea in 2007.

He was named in the Papua New Guinea training squad for the 2008 World Cup, but did not make the final squad.

In 2009 he played for PNG against Australia's Prime Minister's XIII.

In 2010 he played for Australian Universities Rugby League when they toured England and France.

References

External links
Redcliffe Dolphins profile

1988 births
Living people
Eastern Suburbs Tigers players
Papua New Guinea Hunters players
Papua New Guinea national rugby league team players
Papua New Guinean emigrants to Australia
Papua New Guinean rugby league players
People from Milne Bay Province
Redcliffe Dolphins players
Rugby league hookers
University of the Sunshine Coast alumni